Lactura basistriga is a species of tropical burnet moth in the family Lacturidae. It was first described by William Barnes in 1913.

The MONA or Hodges number for Lactura basistriga is 2404.

References

Further reading

External links

 

Moths of North America
Moths described in 1913